State Route 22 (SR 22) is a  state highway that extends from Safford in Dallas County to the Georgia state line near Roanoke in Randolph County. The route travels across most of the state from west to east.

Route description

Starting at an intersection with SR 5 in Safford, the route travels northeast through Selma and Maplesville. The route proceeds towards Verbena and then crosses Mitchell Lake.

The route continues east-northeast through Rockford, Alexander City, New Site and Roanoke on its way to the Georgia state line, where the road becomes Georgia State Route 34. The route is paved throughout and occasionally multi-lane. Counties traversed by the route include Dallas, Chilton, Coosa, Tallapoosa, Chambers, and Randolph.

Major intersections

See also

References

Rand McNally: The Road Atlas 2002, Rand McNally and Company 2001

External links

 Southeastroads.com web page on SR-22 with photos

022
Transportation in Dallas County, Alabama
Transportation in Chilton County, Alabama
Transportation in Coosa County, Alabama
Transportation in Tallapoosa County, Alabama
Transportation in Chambers County, Alabama
Transportation in Randolph County, Alabama